María De Luz Da Silva Dos Santos (Maracay, Aragua, Venezuela) (Born May 10, 1990) is a model with two pageant titles. She represented Mérida state in the Miss Venezuela 2009 pageant on September 24, 2009, and placed in the top 10 semi-finalists. She won the titles Miss Personality and Miss Photogenic. Da Silva currently studies international trade at the Simón Bolívar University in Caracas.

She competed in Miss Friendship International 2009, in Wuhan (China), on November 7, 2009, and was ranked among the top 15 semi-finalists.

Personal life

Maria De Luz Da Silva was born in Maracay, Venezuela, to Portuguese parents.

Career

She was a semi-finalist in the Miss Mérida pageant in 2009. She participated in competitions such as the Miss Friendship International 2009, where she won as Miss Perfect Forms, representing Venezuela, and the Miss Tourism International 2010, representing Portugal.

Her last appearance in a beauty pageant was in Top Model of the World in 2012. She won the first finalist spot, representing Venezuela. In 2012, she obtained the "Pierre Cardin Model Award 2012."

She later became an anchorwoman and was featured on Victoria 103.9FM, a local radio station. Her program was "Cabin for Three, supporting national talent."

References

External links
Miss Venezuela Official Website
Miss Venezuela La Nueva Era MB

1990 births
Living people
Venezuelan people of Portuguese descent
People from Maracay
Venezuelan female models
Venezuelan beauty pageant winners